Keith Alexander (November 23, 1963 – July 11, 2005) was a guitarist, cyclist and body modification enthusiast.

Career

Keith Alexander was the guitarist for the thrash metal band Carnivore, on whose first album he played. He then joined Brooklyn-based band Primal Scream co-writing and recording their 1987 album Volume One.

During the late 1990s he was a member of Dee Snider's SMFs and part of the line-up that recorded the 1997 Twisted Forever - SMFs Live album. Alexander also worked as a talent finder, though he was technically credited as "piercing consultant" on Snider's movie 1998 movie Strangeland. To save money on special effects and for a sense of reality in appearance, Alexander looked in the body modification community for extras, who were modded for some roles.

In the 2000s, he became a somewhat well known blogger, being associated with blogs such as Boing Boing.

Death
Keith Alexander died in a cycling accident on July 11, 2005. He lost control of his bike while passing a child and crashed into a fence on Shore Road, in Bay Ridge Brooklyn. It was reported that had he been wearing a helmet he would likely have survived. Alexander's website, nootrope.net, still exists at archive.org. Regarding his death, he states:

Discography
 Carnivore - Carnivore (Roadrunner, 1985)
 Primal Scream - Volume One (Mercenary, 1987)
 Dee Snider's S.M.F. – Twisted Forever - SMFs Live (Coallier Ent., 1997)

References

1963 births
2005 deaths
Road incident deaths in New York City
Cycling road incident deaths
Musicians from Brooklyn
American heavy metal guitarists
20th-century American guitarists
Guitarists from New York (state)